Mpack may refer to:

 Mpack, Senegal, a border crossing with Guinea-Bissau
 MPack (software), a malware kit developed in Russia
 mpack (Unix), a command-line MIME encoding and decoding utility

See also 
 MPAC (disambiguation)